Sherobod is a city in Surxondaryo Region, Uzbekistan. It is the seat of Sherobod District. The European route E60 passes through the town.

Etimology 
The name is of Persian/Tajiki origin,  Šêrâbâd, standing for 'Lion's Lair' ("sher/shir" for lion, and "abad/obod" for English term, abode).

Population 
The city has a mixed Tajik and Uzbek population, with the former boasting a slim majority. Its population is 29,100 (2016).

References

Populated places in Surxondaryo Region
Cities in Uzbekistan